Gubernatorial Election in Tomsk Oblast were held on 10 September 2017.

Candidates
Candidates on the ballot:

Opinion polls

Result

See also
2017 Russian gubernatorial elections

References

2017 elections in Russia
2017 Russian gubernatorial elections
Politics of Tomsk Oblast